The 1965 Canada Cup took place 30 September – 3 October at the Real Sociedad Hípica Española Club de Campo in Madrid, Spain. It was the 13th Canada Cup event, which became the World Cup in 1967. The tournament was a 72-hole stroke play team event with 37 teams. These were the same teams that had competed in 1964 but with the addition of Czechoslovakia, Monaco and Morocco. Each team consisted of two players from a country. The combined score of each team determined the team results. The South African team of Harold Henning and Gary Player won by eight strokes over the Spanish team of Ángel Miguel and Ramón Sota. The individual competition was won by Gary Player, who finished two shots ahead of Jack Nicklaus.

Teams

Source

The four British and Irish teams did not include any members of the 1965 Ryder Cup team. The Ryder Cup was played the following week and the team had a prior engagement to play in the Honda Foursomes Tournament which was contested at the same time as the Canada Cup.

Ado was representing Monaco, having played for France in 1958.

Scores
Team

Peter Thomson of Australia withdrew during the final round.

International Trophy

Sources:

References

World Cup (men's golf)
Golf tournaments in Spain
Canada Cup
Canada Cup
Canada Cup
Canada Cup